The 2020 NASCAR All-Star Race (XXXVI) was a NASCAR Cup Series stock car exhibition race that was originally scheduled to be held on May 16, 2020 and was rescheduled on July 15, 2020, at Bristol Motor Speedway in Bristol, Tennessee. Contested over 140 laps, it is the second exhibition race of the 2020 NASCAR Cup Series season. It was the first All-Star Race since the 1986 Winston at Atlanta Motor Speedway to be hosted outside Charlotte Motor Speedway.

Report

Background

The All-Star Race is open to race winners from last season through the 2020 Quaker State 400 at Kentucky Speedway, all previous All-Star race winners, NASCAR Cup champions who had attempted to qualify for every race in 2020, the winner of each stage of the All-Star Open, and the winner of the All-Star fan vote are eligible to compete in the All-Star Race.

As part of scheduling changes associated with the COVID-19 pandemic, and citing a desire to host the race with fans (which is not currently possible due to current health orders in North Carolina), the All-Star Race was moved from Charlotte Motor Speedway to Bristol Motor Speedway.

While most NASCAR races held since the resumption have been held behind closed doors with no spectators, the All-Star Race admitted 30,000 spectators with social distancing. Although this was only 20% of the venue's total capacity of 162,000, the All-Star Race hosted the largest number of spectators at a U.S. sporting event since the beginning of pandemic-related restrictions.

A new "choose rule" was used for restarts during the race, where drivers could choose whether they wanted to be in the inside or outside lane. NASCAR experimented with an underglow lighting package on vehicles at the All-Star Race, color-coded by manufacturer (with Chevrolet in orange, Ford in blue, and Toyota in red). This package was featured on the vehicles of all drivers who had automatically qualified for the event. At the request of teams, NASCAR also experimented with moving the numbers on the sides of vehicles closer to their rear tires, in order to provide additional room for sponsor logos.

Entry list
 (R) denotes rookie driver.
 (i) denotes driver who is ineligible for series driver points.

NASCAR All Star Open

NASCAR All-Star Race

Qualifying (Open)
Michael McDowell was awarded the pole for the open as determined by a random draw.

Open Starting Lineup

Qualifying (All-Star Race)
Martin Truex Jr. was awarded the pole for the race as determined by a random draw.

All-Star Race Starting Lineup

NASCAR All Star Open

NASCAR All Star Open results

All-Star Race

All-Star Race results

 Because of multiple pre-race inspection fails, Martin Truex Jr. was moved to the last starting position during the pace laps.

Media

Television
Fox Sports was the television broadcaster of the race in the United States. Lap-by-lap announcer, Mike Joy and Jeff Gordon covered the race from the Fox Sports studio in Charlotte. Regan Smith and Matt Yocum reported from pit lane. Larry McReynolds provided insight from the Fox Sports studio in Charlotte. This was also Fox Sports' last Cup race for their portion of the 2020 season as NBC Sports takes over NASCAR broadcasts for the rest of the season.

Radio
Motor Racing Network (MRN) continued their longstanding relationship with Speedway Motorsports to broadcast the race on radio. The lead announcers for the race's broadcast were Alex Hayden and Jeff Striegle. The network also implemented two announcers on each side of the track: Dave Moody in turns 1 and 2 and Kyle Rickey in turns 3 and 4. Winston Kelly and Steve Post were the network's pit lane reporters. The network's broadcast was also simulcast on Sirius XM NASCAR Radio.

References

NASCAR All-Star Race
NASCAR All-Star Race
NASCAR All-Star Race
NASCAR races at Bristol Motor Speedway
NASCAR All-Star Race